Besa or BESA may refer to:

Arts & entertainment
 Besa (newspaper), a newspaper published in Albania
 Besa (TV series), a Serbian-British television series produced by Adrenalin and Red Planet Pictures
 The Besa, a novel by Albanian-American actress, author, producer and humanitarian Masiela Lusha
 Solemn Promise, a 2009 Serbian drama film directed by Srđan Karanović

Organizations
 Begin–Sadat Center for Strategic Studies (BESA Center), an Israeli think tank
 British Educational Suppliers Association, a trade association of manufacturers and distributors of equipment for the education market
 Building Engineering Services Association, the main UK trade association for HVACR companies

Football
 FC Besa Pejë, a football club based in Peja, Kosovo
 KF Besa Kavajë, a professional Albanian football club based in Kavajë
 KF Besa Sllupçan, a football club based in the village of Sllupçan near Kumanovo, North Macedonia

Places
 Besa (Attica), a deme of ancient Athens
 Beša, Levice District, a village and municipality in the Levice District in the Nitra Region of south-west Slovakia
 Beša, Michalovce District, a village and municipality in Michalovce District in the Kosice Region of eastern Slovakia
 Besa, an Egyptian village located near the Hadrian-founded city of Antinoöpolis
 Daneș (previously Beșa), a commune in Mureș County, Transylvania, Romania

Other
 Banco Económico (Angola) (previously Banco Espírito Santo Angola), an Angolan bank based in Luanda
 Besa (Albanian culture), an Albanian cultural precept that means "to keep the promise" and "word of honor"
 Besa (singer) (born 1986), Albanian singer and songwriter
 Besa machine gun, a British version of the Czechoslovak ZB-53 air-cooled, belt-fed machine gun
 Besa River, a waterway in northern British Columbia, Canada
 Besa, a  denomination of the Italian Somaliland rupia
 Besa, a genus of algae in the order Gigartinales